A bubble curtain is a system that produces bubbles in a deliberate arrangement in water. It is also called pneumatic barrier. The technique is based on bubbles of air (gas) being let out under the water surface, commonly on the bottom. When the bubbles rise they act as a barrier, a curtain, breaking the propagation of waves or the spreading of particles and other contaminants.

Uses
It can be used for the following purposes:
 to reduce propagation of shock waves (e.g. acoustic waves from engines or pile driving, explosions etcetera),
 to reduce liquid or debris floating on the surface from spreading 
 to prevent salt intrusion
 to control the movements of fish
 for decoration and airing in aquariums

In June 2010, Okaloosa County, Florida used air bubble curtains to help protect their Destin Pass coastline from oil produced in the Gulf of Mexico by the Deepwater Horizon oil spill. They hoped to push oil up to the surface for booms and skimming boats to collect the oil. British multinational oil company BP, who the U.S. government named as the responsible party for the oil spill, was billed for the cost of the project.

Equipment
The technical system basically consists of a compressor and pipe or hose with nozzles. When used to reduce acoustic waves from pile driving, a distribution manifold made of plastic or rubber is commonly used.

Offshore pile driving
Pile driving in connection to offshore construction, most importantly monopile foundations for offshore wind turbines, produces very high levels of underwater noise, capable of inflicting damage to the hearing of marine organisms and deter animals at tens of km from the construction site. Large-scale bubble curtains are now routinely used to mitigate these impacts as they can attenuate the noise significantly, in particular the higher frequencies, above 1 kHz.

See also
 Prairie-Masker
 Sonar decoy

References

Water technology